Maloye Mikhalyovo is a rural locality (a village) in Krasnoplamenskoye Rural Settlement, Alexandrovsky District, Vladimir Oblast, Russia. The population was 7 as of 2010. There is one street.

Geography 
Maloye Mikhalyovo is located 61 km northwest of Alexandrov (the district's administrative centre) by road. Bolshoye Mikhalyovo is the nearest rural locality.

References 

Rural localities in Alexandrovsky District, Vladimir Oblast